The Aircraft Accidents Investigation Commission (AAIC, 航空事故調査委員会 Kōkūjiko chōsa iinkai) was a government agency of Japan which investigated aviation accidents and incidents. It was subordinate to the Ministry of Transport, and after January 2001 the Ministry of Land, Infrastructure, Transport and Tourism (MLIT).

It was founded in 1974, following the All Nippon Airways Flight 58 Shizukuishi aircraft accident on July 30, 1971, and the Toa Domestic Airlines Flight 63 accident. On 1 October 2001 the agency was replaced by the Aircraft and Railway Accidents Investigation Commission (ARAIC). After a train accident occurred on the Tokyo Metro Hibiya Line on March 8, 2000, the former AAIC was restructured to ARAIC to also deal with railway accidents.

Investigations
 China Airlines Flight 140
 Garuda Indonesia Flight 865
 Japan Airlines Flight 123
 Japan Airlines Flight 350
 Japan Air System Flight 451

See also

 Japan Civil Aviation Bureau

References

External links
 
 (Information in English)

Ministry of Land, Infrastructure, Transport and Tourism
Japan
1974 establishments in Japan
Organizations established in 1974
Organizations disestablished in 2001
Aviation organizations based in Japan#

ja:航空事故調査委員会